The 2016 United States presidential election in Colorado was held on Tuesday, November 8, 2016, as part of the 2016 United States presidential election in which all 50 states plus the District of Columbia participated. Colorado voters chose electors to represent them in the Electoral College via a popular vote, pitting the Republican Party's nominee, businessman Donald Trump, and running mate Indiana Governor Mike Pence against Democratic Party nominee, former Secretary of State Hillary Clinton, and her running mate Virginia Senator Tim Kaine. Colorado has nine electoral votes in the Electoral College.

Clinton received 48.2% of the vote, carrying the state's nine electoral votes. Trump received 43.3% of the vote, thus marking a Democratic margin of victory of 4.9%. This was the fourth time since Colorado had achieved statehood that the Republican nominee won the election without carrying Colorado, the first three having been in 1896, 1900, and 1908 (all when the Democratic nominee was William Jennings Bryan of neighboring Nebraska, a populist with unusual popularity in the traditionally Republican West); and the second time Colorado has voted Democratic in three consecutive presidential elections, the first having been the elections of 1908, 1912, and 1916. Trump became the first ever Republican to win the White House without carrying Alamosa or Broomfield Counties, as well as the first to do so without carrying Jefferson, Arapahoe, or Larimer Counties since William McKinley in 1900, and the first to do so without carrying Ouray County since William Howard Taft in 1908.

At the same time, Trump flipped five counties in the state: Conejos, Chaffee, Huerfano, Las Animas, and Pueblo. The last two had not supported a Republican presidential candidate since Richard Nixon's landslide in 1972. Despite Clinton's victory, this is the sole election since Colorado's Democratic winning streak from 2008 forward that the Democratic candidate's percentage in the state was held to only a plurality.

Caucuses

Democratic caucuses

Opinion polling

Results

 Caucus date March 1, 2016

Results of the county assemblies
Timeframe for the county assemblies: March 2–26, 2016

|-
! rowspan="2" | Candidate
! colspan="2" | State + District delegates
! colspan="3" | Estimated delegates
|-
! Count
! Percentage
! Pledged
! Unpledged
! Total
|- 
| style="text-align:left;" | Bernie Sanders
| 372 || 61.39%
| || || 
|-
| style="text-align:left;"| Hillary Clinton
| 234 || 38.61%
| || || 
|-
| style="text-align:left;"| Uncommitted
| || 
| || || 
|-
! Total
! 606 !! 100%
! !! !! 
|}

Results of the congressional district conventions

|-
! rowspan=2 | District
! rowspan=2 | Delegatesavailable
! colspan=2 | Delegates won
|-
! Sanders
! Clinton
|-
| style="text-align:left" | 1st district
| 8
| 5
| 3
|-
| style="text-align:left" | 2nd district
| 7
| 4
| 3
|-
| style="text-align:left" | 3rd district
| 6
| 4
| 2
|-
| style="text-align:left" | 4th district
| 5
| 3
| 2
|-
| style="text-align:left" | 5th district
| 5
| 3
| 2
|-
| style="text-align:left" | 6th district
| 6
| 3
| 3
|-
| style="text-align:left" | 7th district
| 6
| 4
| 2
|-
! Total
! style="text-align:right" | 43
! style="text-align:right" | 26
! style="text-align:right" | 17
|}

Results of the state convention
State convention date: April 16, 2016

Republican conventions
From April 2–8, 2016, conventions were held in each of Colorado's seven congressional districts. Cruz swept all seven, winning 21 delegates total. On April 9, 2016, the state convention was held to elect the 13 statewide delegates and the 3 RNC delegates. Again, Cruz won all 13 statewide at-large delegates. Cruz was also the only candidate to address the state convention.

A proposal to forbid Colorado Republican delegates from voting for Donald Trump was written in March 2016 by Robert Zubrin. The group "Colorado Republicans for Liberty" handed out fliers of Zubrin's resolution at the state's convention. Irregularities on the ballot were discovered at the state's convention. Delegate #379 (Jerome Parks, a Trump delegate) was replaced on the ballot with a duplicate of delegate #378 (a Ted Cruz delegate). The Colorado Republican Party's Twitter account posted the message "We did it #NeverTrump" after Cruz received all the bound delegates at the April convention. The party claims somebody hacked its Twitter account, and the party claims to be investigating how the message was posted. In May 2015, the Colorado Senate defeated a bill to hold a 2016 presidential primary.  State senators Kevin Grantham, Kent Lambert, Laura J. Woods, and Jerry Sonnenberg voted to stop the bill. Sonnenberg, Woods, Grantham, and Lambert are members of the Ted Cruz "Colorado Leadership Team" for Ted Cruz. Congressman Ken Buck and Colorado Secretary of State Wayne Williams are also members of the Ted Cruz "Colorado Leadership Team".

The conventions were selected through statewide caucuses, which were conducted at the precinct level on March 1. No voter preference poll was held due to a decision in August by the state party to cancel it.

Three candidates contested the Republican presidential conventions:
 Ted Cruz
 John Kasich
 Donald Trump
Marco Rubio and Ben Carson had dropped out of the race by the time the conventions were held, though they were still running during the March 1 caucuses.

Green Party convention
On April 3, the Green Party of Colorado held a presidential nominating convention in Centennial, Colorado, for registered Green voters.

On April 4, the Green Party of Colorado announced that Jill Stein had won the convention and received all 5 delegates.

General election

Polling

Throughout the race, Clinton lead in almost every poll in margins varying between 1 and 11 points, with a few polls showing a tie or a Trump lead. One of the last polls showed a tie between Clinton and Trump, but the last poll showed Clinton leading Trump 50% to 45%, which was very accurate compared to the results. The average of the last three polls showed Clinton leading Trump 44% to 41%.

Predictions

Statewide results
Voter turnout for the 2016 United States presidential election in Colorado was 72.4%.

Results by county

Counties that flipped from Democratic to Republican 

Chaffee (largest city: Salida)
Conejos (largest town: Manassa)
Huerfano (largest city: Walsenburg)
Las Animas (largest city: Trinidad)
Pueblo (largest city: Pueblo)

By congressional district
Clinton won 4 of 7 congressional districts including one held by a Republican representative.

Analysis
Historically, Colorado has been, following the Bryan-Wilson period, one of the most Republican states in the nation. From 1920 through 2004, Colorado voted Democratic only five times—in Franklin Roosevelt's two landslide wins in 1932 and 1936; for Harry Truman in 1948; in Lyndon Johnson's landslide win in 1964; and for Bill Clinton in 1992, with Ross Perot running substantially ahead of his national showing in the state. (With the shrinkage of the Perot vote in 1996, Colorado, along with Montana, another Western state where Perot had performed exceptionally well, reverted to Dole.) Before 2016, no Republican had won without Colorado since 1908.

However, increasing urbanization in the Front Range Urban Corridor, along with the growth of minority populations (especially Hispanics) have chipped away from Republican dominance in the state: while President George W. Bush won the state in the 2004 election, it was one of the few states where Republican performance fell (with Bush's margin being nearly halved with respect to 2000), presaging Barack Obama's two Colorado wins in 2008 and 2012. 
Trump did improve upon previous Republican candidates in Southern Colorado, carrying three of the area's counties (Conejos County, Las Animas County and Huerfano County), a feat not accomplished by any Republican since George H. W. Bush in his decisive 1988 victory. He also carried Pueblo County by a 0.49% margin, becoming the first Republican to carry it since 1972. Southern Colorado, a blue-collar, working-class, industrial area, had once been the state's Democratic stronghold, but Democratic dominance of the region is starting to fade. Trump also did well in the traditionally Republican Western Slope, where counties such as Mesa County (home to Grand Junction) went for Trump by a 2–1 margin and the Eastern Plains, where Republicans often carried counties by 80% or more.

However, as is with the case with Nevada and other states in the American Southwest that have been experiencing increasing urbanization and a rapidly growing Hispanic population, Clinton won by running up the margins in the rapidly growing metro areas of the state, in this case principally Denver and its suburbs, as well as Boulder and Fort Collins. Hillary Clinton exceeded Obama's performance in the City and County of Denver and Boulder County. While these had long been the Democrats' main base in Colorado, Republicans had typically managed at least a quarter of the vote in the former and at least 30% in the latter when Colorado was a Republican state. In contrast, Trump managed only 18.9% and 22.0% in the two jurisdictions, respectively. Hillary Clinton did not improve on Obama in Larimer County (home of Fort Collins), but she did win the county, which had voted Republican in every election from 1920 through 2004 save 1936, 1964, and 1992, and Trump posted the worst showing for a Republican in the county since 1992. Also, while rural western Colorado leans Republican, it is not nearly as strongly conservative as other rural areas, as much of the economy on the I-70 corridor is based on tourism and outdoors recreation and has a liberal environmentalist bent: rural counties with heavily tourist based economies such as Gunnison, Eagle, Routt, Pitkin and La Plata are not only some of the most Democratic rural areas in America, but often vote nearly as Democratic as large urban counties.

Similarly, even though Hillary Clinton did not improve on Obama's showing in the suburban Denver-area counties of Arapahoe and Jefferson, she nevertheless carried both, both of which had been Republican strongholds up through 2004. Trump posted some of the worst results Republicans have had in decades in this region. Trump only won 39% of the vote in Arapahoe County, which includes some of the largest Denver suburbs such as Aurora and Centennial; before Obama won this county in 2008, this county had not gone Democratic since 1964. Trump won only one county in the metro area (Douglas County—home to suburbs such as Parker, Highlands Ranch and Castle Rock), but with only 54% of the vote—one of the poorest performances in the area's most Republican county in decades. Only in Adams County, the one county in the area outside the city of Denver itself that had been a Democratic stronghold prior to 2008, did Trump manage to improve upon Romney, but even here he was barely above 40% of the vote.

Meanwhile, while Trump did win the one remaining large Republican stronghold in the state, El Paso County (home of Colorado Springs), he won with only 56% of the vote, performing worse in the county than McCain in 2008 or Dole in 1996. The confluence of Hillary Clinton's strength in Denver, Boulder, and the Denver suburbs, and Trump's weakness in El Paso County, ultimately handed the state to Clinton.

In downballot races, Mike Coffman was ultimately able to hold on to his seat in a Clinton-carried district around Arapahoe County. Democrats made big gains in this area in the State House and Senate. However, Republicans were able to gain a seat in Adams County, ultimately holding on to the State Senate.

See also
 2016 Democratic Party presidential debates and forums
 2016 Democratic Party presidential primaries
 2016 Republican Party presidential debates and forums
 2016 Republican Party presidential primaries

References

External links
 RNC 2016 Republican Nominating Process 
 Green papers for 2016 primaries, caucuses, and conventions

CO
2016
Presidential